was a town located in Gujō District, Gifu Prefecture, Japan.

History
The town was established as a village in 1955, and later was elevated as a town in 1985.

On March 1, 2004, Yamato, along with the towns of Hachiman and Shirotori, and the villages of Meihō, Minami, Takasu and Wara (all from Gujō District), was merged to create the city of Gujō.

Notes

External links
 Official website of Gujō 

Dissolved municipalities of Gifu Prefecture
Gujō, Gifu